California salamander may refer to:

 California giant salamander
 California slender salamander
 California tiger salamander

Animal common name disambiguation pages